Michael Gelfand, CBE, (December 1912 – July 1985) was a Zimbabwean colonial medical practitioner, who received a Papal Order of the Knighthood of St. Sylvester. Born in South Africa, Gelfand was noted for a humanistic approach to medicine and for his historical and ethnographic works. These played an important role in his re-examination of significant colonial prejudices he held about African peoples, culture, and religious practices.

Early life and education

Gelfand was born in Wynberg, Cape Province, Union of South Africa, in 1912, of immigrant Lithuanian parents. He attended Wynberg Boys' High School and obtained his degree in medicine from the University of Cape Town in 1936. His further medical training was in London.

Career

After qualifying in South Africa and working there and in England, in 1939 Gelfand joined the then-Southern Rhodesia Medical Service as physician, pathologist and radiologist. Once in government service, he quickly gained a reputation by being the only doctor to correctly diagnose the illness of the wife of the Head of the Medical Services.

In 1955, Gelfand founded the Central African Journal of Medicine with Joseph Ritchken, and remained its co-editor for many years. In 1962, he joined the University of Rhodesia as founding Professor of African Medicine. From 1970 until his retirement, in 1977, he was Professor and Head of Department of Medicine, and thereafter Emeritius Professor and Senior Clinical Research Fellow.

Gelfand was professor and chair of the department of medicine at the University of Zimbabwe. His works on rheumatic diseases, including those featured in The Sick African (1944), have been used as a reference for further study of rheumatic diseases in Africa and complications related to tuberculosis, HIV, and other diseases.

Gelfand wrote a total of 330 articles and monographs in various journals on topics ranging from medicine, ethics, philosophy, history and religion, to Shona custom, religion and culture, with titles including "Migration of African Labourers in Rhodesia and Nyasaland (1890 - 1914)" He wrote more than 30 books, amongst them The Sick African and Livingstone, the Doctor.

Gelfand expressed his homophobic leanings in his 1979 article, "The infrequency of homosexuality in traditional Shona society," writing: "The traditional Shona have none of the problems associated with homosexuality [so] obviously they must have a valuable method of bringing up children, especially with regards to normal sex relations, thus avoiding this anomaly so frequent in Western society." More recent studies suggests that homosexuality has likely always been present in Shona society, although being a form of non-reproductive sexuality, it is highly taboo.

Personal life and death

Gelfand married a Bulawayan, Esther Kollenberg, whom he had met at the University of Cape Town. They had three daughters. He was a practitioner of Judaism.

Gelfand died on 19 July 1985, while attending a patient in the Avenues Clinic in Harare, Zimbabwe.

Selected publications

 The Sick African (1944)
 Schistosomiasis in South-Central Africa (1950)
 Medicine and Magic of the Mashona (1956)
 Shona Ritual (1959)
 Medicine in Tropical Africa (1961)
 Medicine and Custom in Africa (1964)
 An African's Religion (1966)
 The African Witch (1967)
 African Crucible (1968)
 Diet and Tradition in an African Culture (1971)
 The Genuine Shona (1973)
 The Spiritual Beliefs Of The Shona: A Study Based On Field Work Among The East Central Shona (1982)
 The Traditional medical practitioner in Zimbabwe: His principles of practice and pharmacopoeia (Zambeziana, Vol 17) (1985)

References

1912 births
1985 deaths
White South African people
South African Jews
South African people of Lithuanian-Jewish descent
South African emigrants to Rhodesia
Health in Africa
University of Cape Town alumni
Alumni of Wynberg Boys' High School
Rhodesian Jews
Zimbabwean Jews
Rhodesian physicians
20th-century Zimbabwean physicians
Academic staff of the University of Zimbabwe
People from Harare
White Rhodesian people
Rhodesian people of Lithuanian-Jewish descent
Rhodesian writers
South African Commanders of the Order of the British Empire